Troy Center is an unincorporated community located in the town of Troy, in Walworth County, Wisconsin, United States.

Notable people
Clifford E. Randall, educator and politician

References

External links
 Sanborn fire insurance maps: 1894 1900

Unincorporated communities in Walworth County, Wisconsin
Unincorporated communities in Wisconsin